The 2004 Züri-Metzgete was the 89th edition of the Züri-Metzgete road cycling one day race. It was held on 22 August 2004 as part of the 2004 UCI Road World Cup. The race was won by Juan Antonio Flecha of Spain.

Result

References 

Züri-Metzgete
Züri-Metzgete
2004